Spyros Bonas (1932 – January 2014) was a Greek sailor. He competed in the 12m² Sharpie event at the 1956 Summer Olympics.

References

External links
 

1932 births
2014 deaths
Greek male sailors (sport)
Olympic sailors of Greece
Sailors at the 1956 Summer Olympics – 12 m2 Sharpie
Sportspeople from Corfu